B K Samant is a folk singer, music director and lyricist from Uttarakhand, known for his viral song Thal Ki Bazar which is most viewed Kumauni or Garhwali music video on YouTube with over 50 million views.

Personal life 
He's born on 26 June 1982 in Singda village near Ghat Lohaghat nagar panchayat in Champawat district in the Indian state of Uttarakhand. Most of music his videos are locally shot.

Discography

References 

Living people
Musicians from Uttarakhand
Indian folk singers
Indian lyricists
People from Champawat district
1982 births